Cabañas is a municipality in the Guatemalan department of Zacapa.

It is a small town of about 10,000, and income is mostly from farming.

The 2008 Aéreo Ruta Maya crash of a Cessna 208 close to Cabañas killed 11 passengers and crew.

Municipalities of the Zacapa Department